The 1970 Ancash earthquake (also known as the Great Peruvian earthquake) occurred on 31 May off the coast of Peru in the Pacific Ocean at . Combined with a resultant landslide, it is the most catastrophic natural disaster in the history of Peru. Due to the large amounts of snow and ice included in the landslide that caused an estimated 66,000-70,000 casualties, it is also considered to be the world's deadliest avalanche.

Earthquake

The undersea earthquake struck on a Sunday afternoon and lasted about 45 seconds. The shock affected the Peruvian regions of Ancash and La Libertad. It had a moment magnitude of 7.9 and a maximum Mercalli intensity of VIII (Severe). The focal mechanism and hypocentral depth of the earthquake show that the earthquake was a result of normal faulting within the subducting slab.

Damage

The earthquake affected an area of about 83,000 km2, an area larger than Belgium and the Netherlands combined, in the north-central coast and the Sierra (highlands) of the Ancash Region and southern La Libertad Region. Reports of damage and casualties came from Tumbes to Pisco and Iquitos in the east. Damage and panic scenes were reported in some parts of Ecuador. Tremors were also felt in western and central Brazil.

It was a system-wide disaster, affecting such a widespread area that the regional infrastructure of communications, commerce, and transportation was destroyed. Economic losses surpassed half a billion US dollars. Cities, towns, villages—and homes, industries, public buildings, schools, electrical generation and distribution systems, water, sanitary and communications facilities—were seriously damaged or were destroyed.

Areas hard hit were the coastal towns and cities of Chimbote (the largest city in Ancash), Casma, Supe and Huarmey; but the Andean valley known as the Callejón de Huaylas suffered the most intense and sweeping damage, with the regional capital, Huaraz, and Caraz and Aija being partially destroyed. Trujillo, the country's third-largest city, and Huarmey suffered minor damage.

In Chimbote, Carhuaz and Recuay, about 80% to 90% of buildings were destroyed, affecting about three million people.

The Pan-American highway was also damaged, which made the arrival of humanitarian aid difficult. The Cañón del Pato hydroelectricity generator was damaged by the Santa River and the railway connecting Chimbote with the Santa Valley was left unusable on 60% of its route.

The Peruvian government has forbidden excavation in the area where the town of Yungay is buried, declaring it a national cemetery. The children who survived in the local stadium were resettled around the world. In 2000, the tragedy inspired the government to declare 31 May as Natural Disaster Education and Reflection Day.

Every 31 May, many schools of Peru practice an earthquake drill to commemorate this disaster.

Landslide

The northern wall of Mount Huascarán was destabilized, causing a rock, ice and snow avalanche and burying the towns of Yungay and Ranrahirca. The fast-moving mass picked up glacial deposits and by the time it reached Yungay, it is estimated to have consisted of about 80 million m3 of water, mud, rocks and snow.

See also 

 List of earthquakes in 1970
 List of earthquakes in Peru
 Peru–Chile Trench

References 

Sources

External links 
 IRIS SeismoArchive for 1970 Peru earthquake – IRIS Consortium
 Yungay 1970–2009: remembering the tragedy of The Earthquake – Peruvian Times
 "In pictures: Peru's most catastrophic natural disaster" BBC News website (accessed and dated 31 May 2020)
 
Documentary Footage by Texan Relief Workers in Peru, Ancash Earthquake of 1970 on Texas Archive of the Moving Image

Ancash earthquake 1970
Earthquakes in Peru
Ancash earthquake
Ancash
1970 in Peru
1970 tsunamis
Ancash earthquake
May 1970 events in South America
1970 disasters in Peru
Revolutionary Government of the Armed Forces of Peru